Ali Abdul-Amir Allawi (Arabic: علي عبد الامير علاوي) (born 1947) was Iraq's Deputy Prime Minister and Finance Minister

He is an Iraqi politician and scholar. From May 2020 to August 2022, he ran as Iraq's Deputy Prime Minister and Finance Minister. He resigned from the post of finance minister on August 16, 2022 due to the deteriorating political situation in Iraq. He was Minister of Trade and Minister of Defense in the cabinet appointed by the Interim Iraq Governing Council from September 2003 until 2004, and subsequently Minister of Finance in the Iraqi Transitional Government between 2005 and 2006.

Background
Allawi was born in Baghdad in 1947 but spent most of his life in exile. He first left Iraq in 1958. His family had been deeply involved in the politics of the kingdom but found themselves on the wrong side of the 14th of July revolution. After the Ba'ath Party came to power in 1968, Allawi knew a return to Iraq would be impossible. He opposed Saddam Hussein's rule from afar. He went to school in the UK and graduated from MIT in the United States with a BSc in Civil Engineering. After completing an MBA from Harvard University he worked in international development for the World Bank. He co-founded the Arab International Finance merchant bank in 1978. In 1992 he founded the Fisa Group which manages hedge funds. Between 1999 and 2002 he was a Senior Associate at St Antony's College, Oxford.

Later work
In January 2007 The Independent published an article by Allawi outlining a blueprint for peace in Iraq. Allawi recommended devolution within Iraq, economic and political regional integration in the Middle East, and the setting up of independent boards to oversee reconstruction and security issues. The article was praised by Independent commentator Patrick Cockburn, who argued that it was "by far the most perceptive analysis of the extent of the disaster in his country, and how it might best be resolved. It is in sharp contrast to the ill-thought-out maunderings of experts and officials devising fresh policies in the White House and Downing Street".  Allawi has since written The Occupation of Iraq: Winning the War, Losing the Peace and The Crisis of Islamic Civilization. Both books were well received by critics and the reading public. The New York Times Book Review called The Occupation of Iraq "...the most comprehensive historical account of the disastrous aftermath of the American Invasion.

In October 2009 the Washington Institute for Near East Policy announced that his book The Crisis of Islamic Civilization was awarded the Silver Prize of its annual book prize. In December 2009, The Economist named The Crisis of Islamic Civilization one of the Best Books of 2009.In a recent interview with The Diplomat he discussed his views on modern Islamic civilisation. He considers that, as a result of the expansion of Western colonial powers and modernisation over the last 200 years, Islamic civilisation is fast losing its "élan" and has been reduced to two aspects - political and religious - while economic and cultural aspects no longer affect the Muslim world. Allawi was appointed a Visiting Research Professor at the National University of Singapore in 2013–2014. In March 2014, Allawi's biography of Faisal I of Iraq, published by Yale University Press, was released to wide critical acclaim.

Interviews
Ali Allawi on Charlie Rose 04/11/07
Interview with Ali Allawi for Guernica Magazine (guernicamag.com)
 http://www.foreignpolicy.com/story/cms.php?story_id=3330&print=1
After Words interview with Allawi on The Occupation of Iraq, April 14, 2007
Yale University Press site: listen to an interview with Ali A. Allawi on the Yale Press Podcast and to Allawi's first public radio interview on The Diane Rehm Show on WAMU 88.5 FM, American University Radio 
 Interview on ABC's Lateline 12th Sep 07
 Interview with Kurt Schemers on Traders Nation about his book, The Crisis of Islamic Civilization, June 2009
 Interview with Ali Allawi The Diplomat, June 2, 2009

References

External links
 

|-

1947 births
Living people
Iraqi Muslims
Iraqi Shia Muslims
Government ministers of Iraq
Harvard Business School alumni
Iraqi expatriates in the United Kingdom
Iraqi expatriates in the United States
Iraqi monarchists
MIT School of Engineering alumni
People from Baghdad
Finance ministers of Iraq
Iraq portal